Windsor Lake or Lake Windsor or variant, may refer to:

Lakes
 Lake Windsor, Arkansas, USA; a lake
 Lake Windsor, Wisconsin, USA; a lake, see List of lakes of Wisconsin
 Lake Windsor, Great Inagua, Inagua, Bahamas; a lake

Other uses
 Windsor Lake, Newfoundland and Labrador, Canada; a provincial electoral district
 Lake Windsor, Wisconsin, USA; a community

See also

 Windsor (disambiguation)
 Lake (disambiguation)